Heksenketel is a documentary film released on VHS by Canadian rock band The Tragically Hip.  It features concert footage and other clips of the band and crew as they travel across Canada from coast to coast during their 1993 tour, Another Roadside Attraction.

Trivia 
Heksenketel was originally the name of the Another Roadside Attraction tour before it was changed. In the Dutch language 'Heksenketel' literally means "witch's cauldron", though it is mostly used in the vernacular sense, meaning bedlam or pandemonium.

References

The Tragically Hip albums
1993 video albums
Live video albums
1993 live albums